Described as danceable melancholia for the depressed, Indie Rock Blues is an uninterrupted mix of songs from various rock groups remixed by Joe Beats. The album was originally released on Arbied in 2005. In 2006, 24-7 Records released a vinyl version of it.

Track listing

|-
|14
|"betty the nun"
|3:37
|Scarlet Umbrella
|}

External links
Indie Rock Blues on MySpace
Official Joe Beats website

2005 albums
Joe Beats albums